Geochang Provincial College is a public university located in Geochang, South Korea.

See also
List of national universities in South Korea
List of universities and colleges in South Korea
Education in Korea

References

External links 
  

Public universities and colleges in South Korea
Universities and colleges in South Gyeongsang Province
Educational institutions established in 1996
1996 establishments in South Korea